Marcus Annius Libo was a Roman Senator active in the early second century AD.

Life
Libo came from the upper ranks of the Roman aristocracy. He was the son of Marcus Annius Verus, consul III in 126, and Rupilia Faustina. Annius Verus was Spanish of Roman descent. Rupilia was the daughter of Lucius Scribonius Libo Rupilius Frugi Bonus and Vitellia (daughter of emperor Vitellius). Libo is known to have had three siblings, two sisters and one brother. His elder sister was the Empress Faustina the Elder (mother of the Empress Faustina the Younger) and his younger sister (whose name is missing, but surmised to be Annia) was the wife of Gaius Ummidius Quadratus Sertorius Severus, suffect consul in 118. His brother was Marcus Annius Verus, the father of Marcus Aurelius.

He was consul in 128 as the colleague of Lucius Nonius Calpurnius Torquatus Asprenas. Libo was the paternal uncle of the Emperor Marcus Aurelius.

Beyond his consulship, almost nothing is known of his senatorial career. During the reign of his brother-in-law, Antoninus Pius, he was one of seven witnesses to a Senatus consultum issued to the city of Cyzicus in 138, which sought approval for establishing a corpus juvenum for the education of young men.

Family 
Libo married a noblewoman whose name has been surmised as Fundania, daughter of Lucius Fundanius Lamia Aelianus, consul in 116, and wife Rupilia Annia. They are known to have together two children:
 Marcus Annius Libo, suffect consul in 161. He is known to have a son, Marcus Annius Flavius Libo.
 Annia Fundania Faustina, wife of Titus Pomponius Proculus Vitrasius Pollio, consul II in 176

Sources

Nerva–Antonine dynasty
2nd-century Romans
Senators of the Roman Empire
Imperial Roman consuls
Year of birth unknown
Libo, Marcus Annius